Lobodon Island is an island lying  east of Wauters Point, Two Hummock Island, in the Palmer Archipelago, Antarctica. It was photographed by the Falkland Islands and Dependencies Aerial Survey Expedition in December 1956, and was named by the UK Antarctic Place-Names Committee in 1960 after Lobodon carcinophagus, the crabeater seal.

See also 

 List of Antarctic and sub-Antarctic islands

References 

Islands of the Palmer Archipelago